The Stopper of the Year Award was created in 2005 to honor college baseball's top relief pitcher. The award is administered and voted on by the National Collegiate Baseball Writers Association. The current holder of the award is Kevin Kopps of the Arkansas Razorbacks.

Past winners

See also

List of college baseball awards

Notes

References

External links
 History and selection process

College baseball trophies and awards in the United States
Awards established in 2005